Marita Kvarving Sølberg  (born March 22, 1976) is a Norwegian soprano.

Education
Sølberg studied at the "National College of Operatic Art" in Oslo and at the "Norwegian Academy of Music" in Oslo.

Career
Sølberg has worked with Marc Minkowski, Zubin Mehta, Michel Plasson and other conductors.
From 2006 to 2008 Solberg was a principal singer at the Staatsoper, Stuttgart. Other opera engagements include Gran Teatre del Liceu, Barcelona, Teatro Real, Madrid, Komische Oper, Berlin and the Norwegian National Opera.

Operatic roles
 Michaela in Carmen
 Pamina in Die Zauberflöte (2008, 2009)
 Servilia in La clemenza di Tito
 Title role in Zaide (2008)
 Zerlina in Don Giovanni
 Celia in Lucio Silla
 Gretel in Hänsel und Gretel (2008)
 Marzelline in Fidelio
 Charmion in Massenet's Cléopatre
 The angel in Messiaen's Saint François d'Assise.
 Bellezza in George Frideric Handel's Il Trionfo del tempo e del disinganno (Rinaldo Alessandrini.)

Orchestral and chamber music
 Gustav Mahler's Symphony No. 2 (Zubin Mehta).
  Una voce dal cielo from Don Carlo
 Wolfgang Amadeus Mozart, arias (Norwegian National Opera gala concert)
 Handel, Messiah, in Moscow (Peter Neumann)
 Felix Mendelssohn, Elijah, with Gothenburg Symphony Orchestra (Rafael Frühbeck de Burgos)

Awards
In August 2001, Solberg won first prize at the Queen Sonja Singing Competition in Oslo.
In July 2004, Solberg won third prize as well as the "International Media Jury Award" at the "International Hans Gabor Belvedere Singing Competition" in Vienna.

Discography
Grieg - Peer Gynt (The Complete Incidental Music), BIS, (June, 2005)
Grieg - Olav Trygvason / Orchestral Songs, 2006

External links
Marita Kvarving Sølberg official WWW
Solberg's biography at Artefact Artists Management (AAM) website 
Solberg singing Solveigs Sang (Solveig's Song), YouTube

1976 births
Living people
21st-century Norwegian women opera singers
Norwegian operatic sopranos